Acacia blakelyi is a shrub or tree belonging to the genus Acacia and the subgenus Phyllodineae.

Description
The branchlets are flexuous with caducous stipules. The green phyllodes are horizontally flattened with a linear to very narrowly elliptic shape. It blooms from July to September and produces yellow flowers. Inflorescences are made up of three to four globular heads each with a diameter of  each composed of 20 to 30 golden flowers.

Distribution
It is native to an area in the Wheatbelt and the Mid West regions of Western Australia. It is found as far north as an area in between Denham and Kalbarri to around Piawaning in the south on sand plains and gentle rises where it grows in sandy lateritic soils. The shrub is usually part of the understorey in woodland or tall shrubland communities.

See also
 List of Acacia species

References

blakelyi
Acacias of Western Australia
Plants described in 1917
Taxa named by Joseph Maiden